is a Shinto shrine located in Fukutsu, Fukuoka, Japan. It is dedicated to Empress Jingū

See also
List of Shinto shrines
Beppyo shrines

External links

Official Website 

Shinto shrines in Fukuoka Prefecture